Egon Josef Engel (1 December 1918 – 20 August 1974) was an Austrian ice hockey player. He competed in the men's tournament at the 1948 Winter Olympics.

References

External links
 

1918 births
1974 deaths
Ice hockey players at the 1948 Winter Olympics
Ice hockey people from Vienna
Olympic ice hockey players of Austria